Italo Bocchino (born 6 July 1967) is an Italian politician and journalist.

Biography
Bocchino was born in Naples, and in his youth, he was a member of the Italian Social Movement (a post-fascist formation) and worked as a spokesman for the member of parliament Giuseppe Tatarella, and subsequently as a journalist for Il Secolo d'Italia.

In 1996, 2001 and 2006 he was elected to the Italian Chamber of Deputies for National Alliance, the party founded by Gianfranco Fini to replace MSI. In 2005 he was the centre-right candidate for the presidency of the Campania region, but was defeated by Antonio Bassolino. In 2007 he founded Con, a conservative magazine.

Despite having been elected to the Italian Parliament into The People of Freedom lists in 2008, Bocchino in 2010 followed Gianfranco Fini to found Future and Freedom, a centre-right party which aims to counter Silvio Berlusconi's predominance in the Italian right area. Within the party, he is the founder of the Generation Italy movement.

Sources

|-

1957 births
Living people
Politicians from Naples
The People of Freedom politicians
21st-century Italian politicians
Italian Social Movement politicians
20th-century Italian politicians
National Alliance (Italy) politicians
Future and Freedom politicians
University of Naples Federico II alumni
Italian journalists
Italian male journalists